Mahepisa Grobler Tjeriko (born 6 May 1993) is a Namibian rugby union player for the n national team and for the  in the Currie Cup and the Rugby Challenge. His regular position is lock.

Rugby career

Tjeriko was born in Windhoek.

References

1993 births
Living people
Namibia international rugby union players
Namibian rugby union players
Rugby union locks
Rugby union players from Windhoek
Welwitschias players